The Myanmar Ambassador in New Delhi is the official representative of the Government in Naypyidaw to the Government of India.

List of representatives

See also
 India–Myanmar relations

References 

 
India
Myanmar